Ingles is an American regional supermarket chain.

Ingles may also refer to:

Ingles F.C., an English non-league football team
Ingles Ferry, a farm in Virginia
Inglés, a typeface designed by Spain's Nacional Typefoundry

People
Ingles (surname), includes a list of people with the name
Frank Evans (bullfighter) (born 1942), nicknamed "el Inglés", British-born Spanish matador

See also
Playa del Inglés, town in Gran Canaria, Spain
English (disambiguation),
Inglis (disambiguation)